Ouvrage Valdeblore is a lesser work (petit ouvrage) of the Maginot Line's Alpine extension, the Alpine Line. Valdeblore was built  starting in November 1930 by Poiljeux contractors, and was completed by Thorrand et Cie in April 1933 at a cost of 1.6 million francs.

Description 
Block 1 (entry): one machine gun embrasure.
Block 2 (infantry): one machine gun embrasure.
Block 3 (infantry): one twin heavy machine gun embrasure and one heavy machine gun/47mm anti-tank gun embrasure.

Valdeblore covers the D2565 road and the valley of the Valdeblore stream in conjunction with the petit ouvrage Fressinéa and the gros ouvrage Rimplas.

See also 
 List of Alpine Line ouvrages

References

Bibliography 
Allcorn, William. The Maginot Line 1928-45. Oxford: Osprey Publishing, 2003. 
Kaufmann, J.E. and Kaufmann, H.W. Fortress France: The Maginot Line and French Defenses in World War II, Stackpole Books, 2006. 
Kaufmann, J.E., Kaufmann, H.W., Jancovič-Potočnik, A. and Lang, P. The Maginot Line: History and Guide, Pen and Sword, 2011. 
Mary, Jean-Yves; Hohnadel, Alain; Sicard, Jacques. Hommes et Ouvrages de la Ligne Maginot, Tome 1. Paris, Histoire & Collections, 2001.  
Mary, Jean-Yves; Hohnadel, Alain; Sicard, Jacques. Hommes et Ouvrages de la Ligne Maginot, Tome 4 - La fortification alpine. Paris, Histoire & Collections, 2009.  
Mary, Jean-Yves; Hohnadel, Alain; Sicard, Jacques. Hommes et Ouvrages de la Ligne Maginot, Tome 5. Paris, Histoire & Collections, 2009.

External links 
 Valdeblore (petit ouvrage du) at fortiff.be 
 Valdeblore - Map, infos and pictures about the Petit Ouvrage at wikimaginot.eu 
 

VALD
Maginot Line
Alpine Line